Journey to the Center of the Earth is an American science fiction Saturday-morning cartoon, consisting of 17 episodes, each running 30 minutes. Produced by Filmation in association with 20th Century Fox Television, it aired from September 9, 1967 to September 6, 1969 on ABC Saturday Morning. It featured the voice of Ted Knight as Professor Lindenbrook/Sacknussem. It was later shown in reruns on Sci Fi Channel's Cartoon Quest.

It appears to have taken the 1959 film, Journey to the Center of the Earth, as its starting point rather than Jules Verne's original 1864 novel; e.g., including the character of Count Sacknussem and Gertrude the duck. However, it moved even further away from Verne's novel than the 1959 film did.

There are currently no plans to release the series on DVD and/or Blu-ray Disc from 20th Century Studios Home Entertainment, although most of the series is available for viewing on YouTube.

Opening narration
Long ago, a lone explorer named Arne Sacknussem made a fantastic descent to the fabled lost kingdom of Atlantis at the Earth's core. After many centuries, his trail was discovered: first by me, Professor Oliver Lindenbrook, my niece Cindy, student Alec McEwen, our guide Lars and his duck Gertrude. But we were not alone. The evil Count Sacknussem, last descendant of the once noble Sacknussem family, had followed us... to claim the center of the Earth for his power-mad schemes. He ordered his brute-like servant, Torg, to destroy our party. But the plan backfired, sealing the entrance forever. And so, for us, began a desperate race to the Earth's core... to learn the secret of the way back. This is the story of our new journey to the center of the Earth!

Episodes

Series credits
Directed By Hal Sutherland
Co-Directed By Norm McCabe, Lou Zukor
Production Designer: Don Christensen
Layout: Wes Herschensohn, Marilee Heyer, Ken Hultgren, Ray Jacobs, Mel Keefer, Dan Noonan
Storyboards: Jan Green, Sherman Labby
Background Supervisor: Ervin Kaplan
Backgrounds: Venetia Epler, Martin Forte, Jack Healey, Ted Littlefield, Lorraine Morgan, Paul Xander
Animators: Bob Bransford, Clark Davis, Otto Feuer, Ed Friedman, George Grandpre, Bill Hajee, Bob Kirk, Clarke Mallery, Jack Ozark, Amby Paliwoda, Virgil Raddatz, Lenn Redman, Len Rogers, Virgil Ross, Herb Rothwill, Bob Trochim, Xenia
Ink and Paint Supervisor: Martha Buckley
Assistant Ink and Paint Supervisor: Betty Brooks
Animation Check: Ruth Craig, Renee Henning, Barbara Koponen, Ann Oliphant, Jane Philippi, Marion Turk
Editorial Supervisor: Joseph Simon
Assistant Film Editor: Lester Meisenheimer
Film Coordinator: June Gilham
Production Coordinator: Joe Lynch
Production Assistant: Greg Kirsanoff
Background Music Composed By John Gart
Music Supervised By Gordon Zahler
Sound By Ryder Sound Service
Color By Technicolor
Voice Talents Of Ted Knight, Pat Harrington, Jr., Jane Webb
Produced By Lou Scheimer And Norm Prescott

See also
 Where Time Began, 1978 Spanish adventure film based on Journey to the Center of the Earth by Jules Verne.

References

External links
 
 Journey to the Center of the Earth Cartoon Info @ The Big Cartoon Database

Television shows based on works by Jules Verne
Works based on Journey to the Center of the Earth
American Broadcasting Company original programming
1960s American animated television series
1967 American television series debuts
1969 American television series endings
American children's animated science fantasy television series
Animated television shows based on films
Television shows based on French novels
Television series by Filmation
Television series by 20th Century Fox Television
Travel to the Earth's center